Kazanka is a rural locality (a village) in Kazanbulaksky Selsoviet, Zianchurinsky District, Bashkortostan, Russia. The population was 303 as of 2010. There are 2 streets.

Geography 
Kazanka is located 89 km southeast of Isyangulovo (the district's administrative centre) by road. Sagitovo is the nearest rural locality.

References 

Rural localities in Zianchurinsky District